This is a record of Israel's results at the FIFA World Cup. They have qualified for the tournament on one occasion, in 1970. Israel qualified for the 1970 World Cup as an Asian team. Nowadays Israel competes in the European zone as a member of UEFA.

History 
In 1934 and 1938 Mandatory Palestine competed in the World Cup. In 1970 Israel competed in the World Cup for the first time. FIFA states in reference to the 1930s Palestine Mandate team that the 'Palestine team' that had participated in previous competitions in the 1930s was actually the forerunner of today's Israel team and as such bears no relation to the national team of the Palestinian authority. However, the region currently known as Palestine is considered "one of the first Asian teams to compete in the FIFA World Cup qualifiers".

Record at the FIFA World Cup

*Draws include knockout matches decided via penalty shoot-out

By Match

Record by Opponent

1970 FIFA World Cup

At the 1970 FIFA World Cup, Israel participated for the first time. Israel qualified for the FIFA World Cup for the first time in 1970, along with El Salvador and Morocco.

Although it was reported in the build-up to the final draw that seedings would be used, as had been the case at the previous two World Cup Finals, the FIFA Organising Committee ultimately announced that there would be no seeding of teams. Instead, the sixteen teams were divided into four 'geographical groupings', which also took into account the teams' strengths and even political considerations; the system ensured that Israel and Morocco would not be drawn to face each other after Morocco had earlier threatened to withdraw from the tournament, as they had done from the Olympic football tournament two years earlier, if that were the case.

1970 Qualifying Round

1970 Qualifying Round 1
During the 1970 FIFA World Cup qualification Israel received a First Round bye in the first round and moved directly to the Second Round.

1970 Qualifying Round 2
In the second round, North Korea, quarter-finalists at the previous tournament, were disqualified after refusing to play in Israel for political reasons.

1970 Qualifying Final Round

|}

1970 FIFA World Cup Group 2

Head coach: Emmanuel Scheffer

Qualifier history
Through the 2014 qualifier, Israel has entered the qualifiers for the World Cup on 19 occasions. In 1934 and 1938 Palestine, under the British Mandate, competed. As Israel was established in place of Palestine in 1948, Israel began competing in 1950. In all years but 1970 Israel failed to qualify for the World Cup.

At the 1934 FIFA World Cup, Mandatory Palestine competed in the Africa and Asia Group 12 qualifying round. Mandatory Palestine finished in second place and was eliminated.

The Palestine football team consisted of nine British footballers, six Jewish footballers and one Arab footballer. FIFA states in reference to the 1930s Palestine Mandate team that the 'Palestine team' that had participated in previous competitions in the 1930s was actually the forerunner of today's Israel team and as such bears no relation to the national team of the Palestinian authority. However, the region currently known as Palestine is considered "one of the first Asian teams to compete in the FIFA World Cup qualifiers".

Standings

Matches

 

Squad
Coaches:  Egon Pollak,  Shimon Ratner

16/03/1934: 
GK: Willy Berger (Hapoel Tel Aviv)
DF: Avraham Reznik (Maccabi Tel Aviv), Pinhas Fiedler (Maccabi Hasmonean)
MF: Zalman Friedman (Hapoel Tel Aviv), Gedalyahu Fuchs (Hapoel Haifa), Yohanan Sukenik (Hapoel Tel Aviv)
FW: Amnon Harlap (Hapoel Tel Aviv), Ferenc Kraus (Hapoel Tel Aviv), Paul Kastenbaum (Hapoel Tel Aviv), Haim Reich, Avraham Nudelman (Hapoel Tel Aviv)

06/04/1934:
GK: Willy Berger (Hapoel Tel Aviv) 
DF: David Weinberg (Maccabi Tel Aviv), Pinhas Fiedler (Maccabi Hasmonean) 
MF: Zalman Friedman (Hapoel Tel Aviv), Gedalyahu Fuchs (Hapoel Haifa), Yohanan Sukenik (Hapoel Tel Aviv) 
FW: Amnon Harlap (Hapoel Tel Aviv), Ya'akov Levi-Meir (Hapoel Tel Aviv), Ya'akov Zelivanski (Maccabi Tel Aviv), Haim Reich, Avraham Nudelman (Hapoel Tel Aviv)

At the 1938 FIFA World Cup, Mandatory Palestine competed in the UEFA Group 6 qualifying round. Hungary as the strongest team of this group was seeded. Greece and Mandatory Palestine would play against each other on a home-and-away basis, with Hungary playing against the winner at home. Mandatory Palestine lost to Greece in the First Round, and finished in third and last place.

In 1938 World Cup marked the second (1934 being the first) and final time Mandatory Palestine competed in the World Cup. FIFA states in reference to the 1930s Palestine Mandate team that the 'Palestine team' that had participated in previous competitions in the 1930s was actually the forerunner of today's Israel team and as such bears no relation to the national team of the Palestinian authority.

Standings

Matches

 

Game 1 Mandatory Palestine vs Greece

Game 2 Greece vs Mandatory Palestine

Squad
Head coach:  Egon Pollak

At the 1950 FIFA World Cup, Israel competed in the UEFA Group 3 qualifying round. Israel finished in third and last place.

This World Cup was the first for Israel, although they previously competed in 1934 and 1938 as Mandatory Palestine. FIFA states in reference to the 1930s Palestine Mandate team that the 'Palestine team' that had participated in previous competitions in the 1930s was actually the forerunner of today's Israel team and as such bears no relation to the national team of the Palestinian authority.

Standings

Source:

Matches
Israel competed in Group 3, which had 3 teams each. The strongest team, France, was seeded. The winner of the First Round would move on to the Final Round. Israel lost to Yugoslavia in the First Round and was eliminated.

At the 1954 FIFA World Cup, Israel competed in the UEFA Group 10 qualifying round. Israel finished in third and last place.

Standings

Matches

At the 1958 FIFA World Cup, Israel competed in the Africa and Asia qualification round. The round was conducted in a knockout stage format. Israel won its group by default because its three opponents, Turkey, Indonesia and Sudan, refused to play.

The national team was placed in the African/Asian zone and was drawn to play against Turkey in the first round. However, Turkey withdrew in protest of being placed in the African/Asian zone (instead of the European Zone), and Israel advanced to the second round without playing a match, along with Indonesia, Egypt and Sudan. Israel was drawn to play Indonesia, but, as Indonesia refused to play in Israel and as FIFA rejected their request to play against Israel on neutral ground, Indonesia withdrew and Israel advanced to the regional finals, again without playing a match, alongside Sudan. In the final round, Sudan refused to play Israel for political reasons and withdrew. FIFA had imposed a rule that no team would qualify without playing at least one match, after it had happened in several previous World Cups. Wales, which finished second in its group behind Czechoslovakia, was drawn into a play-off, which they won.

CAF / AFC Preliminary Round - Group 2
Turkey refused to compete in the Asian group, so Israel advanced to the Second Round automatically.

CAF / AFC Second Round
Indonesia withdrew after FIFA rejected their request to play against Israel on neutral ground. Israel advanced to the Final Round automatically.

CAF / AFC Final Round
Sudan refused to play against Israel for political reasons, so Israel would technically qualify automatically, but before the qualification rounds began, FIFA ruled that no team would qualify without playing at least one match (except for the defending champions and the hosts), and Israel had yet to play any.

UEFA / AFC Play-off
A special play-off was created between Israel and the runner-up of one of the UEFA Groups, where the teams played against each other on a home-and-away basis, with the winner qualifying. After Belgium refused, Wales, the runner-up of UEFA Group 4, was the team drawn from the UEFA group runners-up.

Standings

Matches

 

At the 1962 FIFA World Cup, Israel competed in the UEFA Group 7 qualifying round. The round was conducted in a knockout stage format. The five teams in this group played in a knockout stage on a home-and-away basis, with Israel finishing in second place, after losing to Italy in the finals.

Bracket

Matches
First Round
Israel defeated Cyprus to advance to the Second Round.

 

Second round
Israel defeated Ethiopia to advance to the Final Round.

 

Final round
Israel lost to Italy in the Final Round to be eliminated.

 

Squad
Head coach:  Gyula Mándi

At the 1966 FIFA World Cup, Israel competed in the UEFA Group 1 qualifying round, finishing in third and last place. Israeli referee Menachem Ashkenazi also participated in the World Cup, officiating the Group 1 game between France and Mexico, as well as the Quarter-finals game between Portugal and North Korea.

Standings

Matches

 

 

 

Squad
Head coach:  Milovan Ćirić

At the 1974 FIFA World Cup, Israel competed in the AFC and OFC qualifying round, losing in the Zone A finals. The 1974 World Cup was Israel's last as an official member of the AFC, as they resigned the Asian Games Federation in 1974.

Classification matches
Based on the results of the classification match Israel was assigned to Group 2 with Thailand and Malaysia.

Group 2
Israel finished in first place in Group 2, moving on to the semi-finals with South Korea.

Standings

Matches
 

 

 

Semifinals
Israel, defeating Japan in the semifinals, advanced to the Zone A finals to face South Korea.

Finals
In the Zone A finals, Israel lost to South Korea, who moved on to the AFC/OFC Final Round.

At the 1978 FIFA World Cup, Israel competed in the AFC and OFC Group 2 qualifying round, finishing in second place. Israel, despite resigning the Asian Games Federation in 1974, was still assigned to compete in the AFC and OFC qualifying round.

Additionally Israeli referee, Abraham Klein, worked games in Group 1, Group A and the third place match.

Standings

Matches

At the 1982 FIFA World Cup, Israel competed in the UEFA Group 6 qualifying round, finishing in fifth and last place.

Israel was previously part of the Asian Games Federation until it was disbanded in 1981. In 1982 Israel was barred joining the new Olympic Council of Asia, Israel opted to join the European Olympic Committees in the early 1990s. The 1982 World Cup Israel was not yet part of the continent group, however was assigned to it.

Standings

Matches

Goalscorers
3 goals
Benny Tabak

2 goals
Gidi Damti

1 goal
Moshe Sinai

At the 1986 FIFA World Cup, Israel competed in the OFC qualification round, finishing in second place.

Israel was previously part of the Asian Games Federation until it was disbanded in 1981. In 1982 Israel was barred joining the new Olympic Council of Asia, Israel opted to join the European Olympic Committees in the early 1990s. The 1986 World Cup Israel was not yet part of a continent group, therefore joining OFC.

Standings

Matches

Goalscorers
5 goals
Zahi Armeli

3 goals
Rifaat Turk
Avi Cohen
Eli Ohana

2 goals
Uri Malmilian

1 goal
Moshe Selecter

At the 1990 FIFA World Cup, Israel competed in the OFC qualification round, finishing in first place. Israel went on to face Colombia in the CONMBOL vs. OFC playoff, losing 1–0.

Israel was previously part of the Asian Games Federation until it was disbanded in 1981. In 1982 Israel was barred joining the new Olympic Council of Asia, Israel opted to join the European Olympic Committees in the early 1990s. The 1990 World Cup Israel was not yet part of a continent group, therefore joining OFC.

OFC qualification
Round 1
In round 1, Israel received a bye and advanced to the final round directly. The remaining four teams were paired up to play knockout matches on a home-and-away basis. The winners would advance to the Second Round.

Round 2
In round 2 Israel competed against Australia and New Zealand, finishing in first place.

Goal Scorers
2 goals
Ronny Rosenthal
Eli Ohana

1 goal
Nir Klinger

CONMEBOL vs OFC playoff
Israel, as the winning team of the OFC qualification tournament played the CONMEBOL group winner with the weakest record in a home-and-away play-off. The winner of this play-off qualified for the 1990 FIFA World Cup.

At the 1994 FIFA World Cup, Israel competed in the UEFA Group 6 qualifying round, finishing in sixth and last place. Israel was previously part of the Asian Games Federation until it was disbanded in 1981. In 1982 Israel was barred joining the new Olympic Council of Asia, Israel opted to join the European Olympic Committees in the early 1990s. The 1994 World Cup was the first in which Israel competed in Europe.

Standings

Matches

Goalscorers
3 goals
Ronen Harazi

2 goals
Itzik Zohar
Ronny Rosenthal

1 goal
Tal Banin
Eyal Berkovic
Reuven Atar

At the 1998 FIFA World Cup, Israel competed in the UEFA Group 5 qualifying round, finishing in third place.

Standings

Matches

Goalscorers
3 goals
Eli Ohana

2 goals
Tal Banin
Itzik Zohar

1 goal
Ronen Harazi
Gadi Brumer

At the 2002 FIFA World Cup, Israel competed in the UEFA Group 7 qualifying round, finishing in third place.

Standings

Matches

Goalscorers
2 goals
Haim Revivo

1 goal
Yossi Abuksis
Pini Balili
Eyal Berkovich
Yaniv Katan
Alon Mizrahi
Avi Nimni
Idan Tal
Shimon Gershon
Michael Baur

At the 2006 FIFA World Cup, Israel competed in the UEFA Group 4 qualifying round, finishing in third place.

Standings

Matches

Goalscorers
4 goals
Yossi Benayoun

3 goals
Adoram Keisi
Avi Nimni

2 goals
Walid Badir

1 goal
Michael Zandberg
Yaniv Katan
Avi Yehiel
Abbas Suan

At the 2010 FIFA World Cup, Israel competed in the UEFA Group 2 qualifying round, finishing in fourth place.

Standings

Matches
The match schedule was established at a meeting in Israel on 8 January 2008.

Goalscorers
6 goals
Elyaniv Barda

4 goals
Omer Golan

3 goals
Yossi Benayoun
Ben Sahar

1 goal
Aviram Baruchyan
David Ben Dayan
Klemi Saban
Salim Tuama

Attendance

At the 2014 FIFA World Cup, Israel competed in the UEFA Group F qualifying round, finishing in third place.

Standings

Matches
The match schedule was determined at a meeting in Luxembourg City, Luxembourg, on 25 November 2011.

Goalscorers
6 goals
Eden Ben Basat
Tomer Hemed

1 goal
Rami Gershon
Maor Melikson
Bibras Natcho
Maharan Radi
Lior Refaelov
Itay Shechter
Eran Zahavi

Record players
Ten players were fielded in all three of Israel's group matches in 1970 by coach Emmanuel Scheffer, making them record World Cup players for their country.

Goalscorers

The only Israeli goal at a FIFA World Cup was scored by team captain Mordechai Spiegler in their 1–1 draw against Sweden on 7 June 1970.

References

External links 
Israel at FIFA.com
List of Israeli Matches at RSSSF

<noinclude>

 
Countries at the FIFA World Cup
World Cup